Simon Mbugua (born 8 June 1991) is a Kenyan international footballer who plays for Posta Rangers, as a right back.

Career
Mbugua has played club football for Thika United and Posta Rangers.

He made his international debut for Kenya in 2016.

References

1991 births
Living people
Kenyan footballers
Kenya international footballers
Thika United F.C. players
Posta Rangers F.C. players
Kenyan Premier League players
Association football fullbacks